Ibtisam Ibrahim Teresa (Arabic: ابتسام ابراهيم تريسى) (born 1959) is a Syrian novelist and short story writer. She studied Arabic at Aleppo University. She has published five novels and two short story collections. Her novel The Eye of the Sun was longlisted for the Arabic Booker Prize in 2011.

References

1959 births
University of Aleppo alumni
Syrian novelists
Syrian women short story writers
Syrian short story writers
Living people
20th-century Syrian women writers
20th-century Syrian writers
21st-century Syrian women writers
21st-century Syrian writers